Spulerina astaurota is a moth of the family Gracillariidae. It is known from India (Assam, Meghalaya), Japan (Kyūshū, Shikoku, Honshū), Korea and the Russian Far East.

The wingspan is 9.2-11.2 mm.

The larvae feed on Chaenomeles species, Malus domestica, Malus sieboldii, Malus sylvestris, Prunus domestica, Prunus serotina, Pyrus communis and Pyrus pyrifolia. They mine the stem of their host plant.

References

Spulerina
Moths of Asia
Moths of Japan
Moths described in 1922